Julienne David (1773-1843), was a French privateer.

Julienne David participated in the Vendée Revolt on the royalists side and was imprisoned, but managed to escape sentence. After having secured a privateer's letter, she persecuted British ships on the English channel from her base in Nantes.

In 1803, she was imprisoned in England for 8 years. After her release, she returned to France. A street in Nantes is named after her. She's also the subject of a novel.

References 
 Marie-Eve Sténuit, Femmes pirates: Les écumeuses des mers. Paris: Éditions du Trésor 2015. 

French privateers
French pirates
1773 births
1843 deaths
Women in 19th-century warfare
French female pirates
19th-century pirates